Belarusians are an East Slavic ethnic group native to Belarus. Over 9.5 million people proclaim Belarusian ethnicity worldwide. Nearly 8 million Belarusians reside in Belarus, with the United States and Russia being home to more than half a million Belarusians each.

Name
During the Soviet era, Belarusians were referred to as Byelorussians or Belorussians (from Byelorussia, derived from Russian "Белоруссия"). Before, they were typically known as White Russians or White Ruthenians (from White Russia or White Ruthenia, based on "Белая Русь"). Upon Belarusian independence in 1991, they became known as Belarusians (from Belarus, derived from "Беларусь"), sometimes spelled as Belarusans, Belarussians or Belorusians. In Russian, the country is still often referred to as "Белоруссия", particularly in Russia.

The term White Rus', also known as White Ruthenia or White Russia (as the term Rus'  is often conflated with its Latin forms Russia and Ruthenia), was first used in the Middle Ages to refer to the area of Polotsk. The name Rus'  itself is derived from the Rus' people which gave the name to the territories of Kievan Rus'. The chronicles of Jan of Czarnków mention the imprisonment of Lithuanian grand duke Jogaila and his mother at "" in 1381. During the 17th century, the Russian tsars used the term to describe the lands added from the Grand Duchy of Lithuania. However, during the Russian Civil War, the term White Russian became associated with the White movement.

Geographic distribution

Belarusians are an East Slavic ethnic group, who constitute the majority of Belarus' population. Belarusian minority populations live in countries neighboring Belarus: Ukraine, Poland (especially in the Podlaskie Voivodeship), the Russian Federation and Lithuania. At the beginning of the 20th century, Belarusians constituted a minority in the regions around the city of Smolensk in Russia.

Significant numbers of Belarusians emigrated to the United States, Brazil and Canada in the early 20th century. During Soviet times (1917–1991), many Belarusians were deported or migrated to various regions of the USSR, including Siberia, Kazakhstan and Ukraine.

Since the 1991 breakup of the USSR, several hundred thousands of Belarusians have emigrated to the Baltic states, the United States, Canada, Russia, and EU countries.

Languages
The two official languages in Belarus are Belarusian and Russian. Russian language was added to the constitution after  1995 Belarusian referendum, together with reinstalment of redesigned flag, coat of arms and anthem of BSSR instead of national ones. The OSCE Parliamentary Assembly stated that the referendum violated international standards. Members of the opposition claimed that the organisation of the referendum involved several serious violations of legislation, including the constitution.

Genetics

Belarusians, like most Europeans, largely descend from three distinct lineages: Mesolithic hunter-gatherers, descended from a Cro-Magnon population that arrived in Europe about 45,000 years ago; Neolithic farmers who migrated from Anatolia during the Neolithic Revolution 9,000 years ago; and Yamnaya steppe pastoralists who expanded into Europe from the Pontic–Caspian steppe in the context of Indo-European migrations 5,000 years ago.

History

Early Middle Ages 
In the Iron Age, the south of present-day Belarus was inhabited by tribes belonging to the Milograd culture (7th-3rd century BC) and later Zarubintsy culture. They are mostly considered Balts. Since the beginning of common era, these lands were penetrated by the Slavs, a process that intensified during the migration period (4th century). A peculiar symbiosis of Baltic and Slavic cultures took place in the area, but it was not a fully peaceful process, as evidenced by numerous fires in Balts' settlements in the 7th-8th centuries. According to Russian archaeologist , it was intensive contacts with the Balts that contributed to the distinctiveness of the Belarusian tribes from the other Eastern Slavs.

The Baltic population gradually became Slavic, undergoing assimilation, a process that for eastern and central Belarus ended around the 12th century. Belarusian lands in the 8th-9th centuries were inhabited by 3 tribal unions: the Krivichs, Dregoviches and Radimichs. Of these, the Krivichs played the most important role; Polotsk, founded by them, was the most important cultural and political center during this period. The principalities formed at that time on the territory of Belarus were part of Kievan Rus'. The process of the beginning of the East Slavic linguistic community and the separation of Belarusian dialects slowly took place.

In the Grand Duchy of Lithuania 
As a result of Lithuanian expansion, the lands of Belarus became part of the Grand Duchy of Lithuania. This fact accelerated the Slavicization of the Baltic population. Also, the rulers and the elite of the Grand Duchy adopted elements of Ruthenian culture, primarily Old Belarusian language, which became the main language of writing. Belarusians began to emerge as a nationality during the 13th and 14th centuries in the Grand Duchy of Lithuania mostly on the lands of the upper basins of Neman River, Dnieper River, and the Western Dvina River. The Belarusian people trace their distinct culture to the Grand Duchy of Lithuania, earlier Kievan Rus' and the Principality of Polotsk.

Litvin was a term used to describe all residents of the Grand Duchy of Lithuania, primarily those belonging to the noble state, without distinction of ethnicity or religion. At the same time, the term Ruthenian (Rusyn) was in use, referring primarily to all persons professing Orthodoxy; later since the end of the 16th century it took on a broader meaning, and also referred to all the persons of Eastern Slavic origin, regardless of their religion. At the same time, there was a geographical division within the Grand Duchy of Lithuania between Lithuania proper and Rus'. However, it did not correspond to an ethnic or confessional division, as Lithuania proper included a large part of central and western Belarus with cities such as Polotsk, Vitebsk, Orsha, Minsk, Barysaw and Slutsk, while the remaining lands inhabited by Slavs were called Rus. From the 17th century onward, the name White Ruthenia spread, which initially referred to the territory of today's Eastern Belarus (Polotsk, Vitebsk). The term "Belarusians", "Belarusian faith" and "Belarusian speech" also appeared at that time. Between the 13th and 16th centuries, a fully distinct Old Belarusian language was formed.

Nevertheless, from the 1630s it is started to be replaced by the Polish language, as a result of the Polish high culture acquiring increasing prestige in the Polish–Lithuanian Commonwealth. In 1697, Ruthenian was removed as one of the Grand Duchy's official languages. By the 17th century, Muscovites began encouraging the use of the word Belarusian and viewed the Belarusians as Russians and their language as a Russian dialect. This was done to legitimize Russian attempts of conquering the eastern lands of the Polish–Lithuanian Commonwealth under the pretense of unifying all Russian lands. During three partitions of the Polish–Lithuanian Commonwealth (1772, 1793 and 1795) most of the territories of the Grand Duchy of Lithuania were annexed by the Russian Empire.

In the Russian Empire 
However, Tsar Nicholas I of Russia banned the use of the word Belarus in 1839, replacing it with the designation Northwestern Krai. Due to the ban, various different names were used for naming the inhabitants of those territories. It was part of the Pale of Settlement, which was the region where Jews were allowed permanent residency.

20th century 
During World War I and the fall of Russian Empire, a short-lived Belarusian Democratic Republic was declared in March 1918. Thereafter, modern Belarus' territory was split between the Second Polish Republic and Soviet Russia during the Peace of Riga in 1921. The latter created the Byelorussian Soviet Socialist Republic, which was reunited with Western Belarus during World War 2 and lasted until the dissolution of the Soviet Union, which was ended by the Belovezh Accords in 1991. The modern Republic of Belarus exists since then.

Cuisine

Belarusian cuisine shares the same roots as the cuisines of other Eastern and Northern European countries.

See also

 List of Belarusians (ethnic group)
 Demographics of Belarus
 Dregovichs
 Krivichs
 Litvin
 Radimichs
 History of Belarus
 Belarusian Americans
 Romani people in Belarus

References

Bibliography

External links

 Ethnographic Map (New York, 1953)
 CIA World Fact Book 2005

Ethnic groups in Kazakhstan
Slavic ethnic groups
History of the Rus' people